Arūnas Savickas (born 24 March 1975) is a retired freestyle swimmer from Lithuania, who was the oldest member (25 years, 174 days) of the national squad (5 men and 1 woman) competing at the 2000 Summer Olympics in Sydney, Australia. He competed in the men's 200 m freestyle and 200 m backstroke. In both individual events he did not reach the final. He also competed at the 1996 Summer Olympics in Atlanta, Georgia.

References
 
LDS Church Almanac, 2009 Edition, p. 327.

1975 births
Living people
Lithuanian male backstroke swimmers
Lithuanian Latter Day Saints
Lithuanian male freestyle swimmers
Swimmers at the 1996 Summer Olympics
Swimmers at the 2000 Summer Olympics
Olympic swimmers of Lithuania
Place of birth missing (living people)